Reading room may refer to:

 Reference library
 British Museum Reading Room
 Christian Science Reading Room, a place where the public can study, borrow, or purchase Christian Science literature
 The Reading Room (film), a 2005 American television film
 The Reading Room (Hasenclever), an 1843 painting by Johann Peter Hasenclever